The Columbia City Council is the lawmaking body of the city of Columbia, Missouri. It has seven elected members, including the Mayor of Columbia. Each member represents one of the city's six wards, except the mayor who is elected by city-wide vote. Council members are elected for three-year terms. Elections are held annually, as the terms are staggered. In addition to lawmaking, the main duties of the council include hiring a city manager and appointing citizens to boards and commissions; of which there are 57 as of 2019. The council members receive a stipend; however, there has been debate over making members full-time city employees. The council meets in Columbia's City Hall, also known as the Daniel Boone Building.

Current Council

The most recent municipal election was April 2, 2019. Incumbent Mayor Brian Treece defeated former Missouri State Representative Chris Kelley. 
Ian Thomas and Karl Skala ran unopposed. The Mayor announced the hiring of Columbia's newest city manager John Glascock on July 15, 2019. Also in 2019, the Associated Press reported that the council "is backing legislation that would ban gay conversion therapy for minors."

Mayor 
Darwin Hindman
Bob McDavid
Brian Treece 2016-2022
Barbara Buffaloe 2022-2025

1st Ward 
 Clyde Ruffin

 Pat Fowler 2020-2023

2nd Ward 
 Andrea Waner

3rd Ward 
 Karl Skala
 Roy Lovelady 2022-2025

4th Ward 
 Ian Thomas
 Nick Foster 2022-2025

5th Ward 
 Matt Pitzer

6th Ward 
 Betsy Peters

History
Darwin Hindman

See also
History of Columbia, Missouri
Board of Aldermen of the City of St. Louis
Kansas City, Missouri City Council

References

External links
Official website
Map of City Wards

Government of Columbia, Missouri
Missouri city councils
Politics of Columbia, Missouri